Annika Beck was the defending champion, but lost in the first round to Barbora Štefková.

Océane Dodin won her maiden WTA singles title, defeating Lauren Davis 6–4, 6–3 in the final.

Seeds

Draw

Finals

Top half

Bottom half

Qualifying

Seeds

Qualifiers

Lucky losers
 Barbora Štefková

Qualifying draw

First qualifier

Second qualifier

Third qualifier

Fourth qualifier

Fifth qualifier

Sixth qualifier

References
Main Draw
Qualifying Draw

Coupe Banque Nationale
Tournoi de Québec
2016 in Canadian tennis